The J.E. Little House is a historic house at 427 Western Avenue in Conway, Arkansas, USA. It is a two-story masonry structure, its walls finished in brick and stucco, with a gabled tile roof that has exposed rafter ends and brackets in the Craftsman style. Its most prominent feature is a projecting two-story Greek temple portico, supported by Tuscan columns. It shelters a balcony set on the roof of a single-story porch, which extends to the left of the portico. It was built in 1919 for John Elijah Little, a local businessman who was a major benefactor of both Hendrix College and Faulkner County Hospital.

The house was listed on the National Register of Historic Places in 1999.

See also
National Register of Historic Places listings in Faulkner County, Arkansas

References

Houses on the National Register of Historic Places in Arkansas
Neoclassical architecture in Arkansas
Houses completed in 1919
Houses in Conway, Arkansas